Wesley Koolhof and Neal Skupski defeated Aleksandr Nedovyesov and Aisam-ul-Haq Qureshi in the final, 6–4, 6–4 to win the men's doubles tennis title at the 2022 Melbourne Summer Set 1.

This was the first edition of the tournament.

Seeds 
All seeds received a bye into the second round.

Draw

Finals

Top half

Bottom half

References

External links 
Draw

2022 ATP Tour